Josef Benedikt Bremm (3 May 1914 – 21 October 1998) was an officer in the Wehrmacht of Nazi Germany during World War II. He was a recipient of the Knight's Cross of the Iron Cross with Oak Leaves and Swords. Although Veit Scherzer challenged the presentation of the Swords in 2007, Bremm was the highest decorated soldier of the Eifel region.

Early life and military career
Bremm was born in Mannebach, Vulkaneifel, in the German Empire, on 3 May 1914. He was the son of Volksschule teacher Adolf Bremm and his wife Maria, née Müller. He attended the Kurfürst-Balduin-Schule (Baldwin of Luxembourg school) in Münstermaifeld and graduated with his Abitur (university-preparatory high school diploma).

After the National Socialist seizure of power in Germany, he was conscripted into military service in the Heer (army of Nazi Germany) on 1 November 1935. Bremm was posted to Infantry Regiment 7 which was stationed in Schweidnitz, present-day Świdnica in south-western Poland. The regiment was initially subordinated to the 8th Infantry Division, and in October 1936 it formed the nucleus of the newly created 28th Infantry Division. Bremm served three years with this regiment and was promoted to Gefreiter on 1 October 1936, to Unteroffizier (sergeant) on 1 June 1937, to Feldwebel of the Reserves on 1 October 1937, and to Leutnant (second lieutenant) of the Reserves on 29 January 1938. On 31 October 1938, he was discharged from military service and was listed with Infantry Regiment 425. The next day, he joined the Nazi Party.

World War II
Bremm was reactivated as an officer of the reserves on 30 August 1939, one day before the German Invasion of Poland which marked the beginning of World War II in Europe. Initially given the role of platoon leader (Zugführer) in the 2nd battalion of Infantry Regiment 453 (II./Inf.Rgt. 453), a regiment of the 253rd Infantry Division. On 1 November 1939, Bremm was appointed adjutant in II./Inf.Rgt. 453. On 10 May 1940, Bremm, as a member of the 253rd Infantry Division, participated in the Battle of Belgium and Battle of France.

Nomination for the Swords to his Knight's Cross
In April 1945, Kampfgruppe Bremm, which was also known as Grenadier-Battalion Bremm, and subordinated to the 326th Volksgrenadier Division as part of the 11th Army, had a strength of 150 soldiers and was made up of the remnants of Grenadier-Regiment 990 of the 277th Volksgrenadier Division. Bremm commanded this unit in the vicinity of Kassel. There, supported by  Tiger II tanks, he led a number of counterattacks against an armored spearhead of the U.S. Third Army in the Battle of Kassel, for which he was nominated for the Knight's Cross of the Iron Cross with Oak Leaves and Swords. Bremm was never officially awarded the Swords to his Knight's Cross. By the time the nomination was processed, the 11th Army had already surrendered near Blankenburg. Adolf Hitler had forbidden the presentation of awards to soldiers who either were prisoners of war or who were reported as missing in action. Bremm had been nominated by the commanding general of the LXVII. Army Corps General der Infanterie Otto Hitzfeld on 12 April 1945. On 23 April 1945, the OB West, Generalfeldmarschall Albert Kesselring, approved this nomination. The Heerespersonalamt (Army Personnel Agency), department P5, deferred this nomination on 28 April 1945. The Association of Knight's Cross Recipients claims that the Swords were presented in accordance with the Dönitz-decree and assigned the presentation number 159. The Dönitz-decree was assessed by the Deutsche Dienststelle (WASt) in 1988. The WASt concluded the Dönitz-decree to be lacking legal justification.

Later life
Bremm was married to Agnes Steffens (1925–2011), the marriage was childless. He died on 21 October 1998 in Monreal.

Awards
 Iron Cross (1939)
 2nd Class (27 June 1940)
 1st Class (15 December 1940)
 Infantry Assault Badge (13 November 1941)
 Wound Badge (1939)
 in Black (17 July 1941)
 in Silver (1 June 1942)
 in Gold (12 January 1943)
 Eastern Front Medal (25 July 1942)
 Tank Destruction Badge for Individual Combatants
 Close Combat Clasp in Bronze (1 July 1943)
 Knight's Cross of the Iron Cross with Oak Leaves and Swords
 Knight's Cross on 18 February 1942 as Leutnant of the Reserves and chief of the 5./Infanterie-Regiment 426
 165th Oak Leaves on 23 December 1942 as Oberleutnant of the Reserves and chief of the 5./Grenadier-Regiment 426
 159th Swords on 9 May 1945 as Oberstleutnant and commander of Grenadier-Regiment 990

Promotions

Notes

References

Citations

Bibliography

 
 
 

 
 
 
 
 
 
 
 
 

1914 births
1998 deaths
People from the Rhine Province
People from Vulkaneifel
Recipients of the Knight's Cross of the Iron Cross with Oak Leaves and Swords
German Army officers of World War II
German prisoners of war in World War II held by the United States
Military personnel from Rhineland-Palatinate